Pierre-André Boutin (born December 2, 1934) is a former Canadian politician and teacher. Born in Ste-Marguerite, Quebec, he was elected to the House of Commons of Canada in 1962 as a Member of the Social Credit Party to represent the riding of Dorchester. He was re-elected in 1963, then defeated in 1965.

References

1934 births
Candidates in the 1965 Canadian federal election
Members of the House of Commons of Canada from Quebec
Social Credit Party of Canada MPs
Living people